Laurel County is a county located in the southeastern portion of the U.S. state of Kentucky. As of the 2020 census, the population was 62,613. Its county seat is London. After a special election in January 2016 alcohol sales are permitted only in the city limits of London. The ordinance went into effect on March 27, 2016, 60 days after results of the election. Laurel County is included in the London, KY Micropolitan Statistical Area.

History
Laurel County, the 80th county to be organized in Kentucky, was established by an act of the general assembly, December 21, 1825, from parts of Rockcastle, Clay, Knox and Whitley Counties. Laurel County was named from the Laurel River, noted for dense laurel thickets along its banks.

Laurel County was the location of the Battle of Wildcat Mountain, a pivotal yet little known battle during the American Civil War that kept Confederate armies from advancing on Big Hill, a major stronghold during the war.

After a fire damaged the courthouse in 1958, a new structure was completed in 1961.

The first Kentucky Fried Chicken was started in southern Laurel County by Colonel Harland Sanders just north of Corbin. Nowadays, visitors are welcomed to the original cafe and museum where they can eat at, tour, and learn about the start of the worldwide franchise. Due to the history of chicken in the county, The World Chicken Festival is celebrated every year in London, the county seat, drawing crowds of up to 250,000 people over the four-day festival.

Geography
Part of Laurel River Lake is in Laurel County.

Adjacent counties
 Jackson County  (northeast)
 Clay County  (east)
 Knox County  (southeast)
 Whitley County  (south)
 McCreary County  (southwest)
 Pulaski County  (west)
 Rockcastle County  (northwest)

National protected area
 Daniel Boone National Forest (part)

Demographics

As of the census of 2020, there were 62,613 people, 22,573 (2015-2019) households, and families residing in the county. The racial makeup of the county was 95.66% White, 1.63% Black or African American, 0.37% Native American, 0.35% Asian, 0.01% Pacific Islander, 0.08% from other races, and 0.90% from two or more races.  0.55% of the population were Hispanics or Latinos of any race.

As of the census of 2010, Laurel County was 97.00% White or European American, 0.3% Native American and 0.7% Black or African American.

There were 20,353 households, out of which 35.20% had children under the age of 18 living with them, 60.60% were married couples living together, 11.40% had a female householder with no husband present, and 24.50% were non-families. 21.70% of all households were made up of individuals, and 8.20% had someone living alone who was 65 years of age or older.  The average household size was 2.56 and the average family size was 2.97.

The age distribution was 25.40% under 18, 9.20% from 18 to 24, 30.40% from 25 to 44, 23.50% from 45 to 64, and 11.50% who were 65 or older.  The median age was 36 years. For every 100 females, there were 95.60 males.  For every 100 females age 18 and over, there were 92.80 males.

The median income for a household in the county was $27,015, and the median income for a family was $31,318. Males had a median income of $27,965 versus $19,757 for females. The per capita income for the county was $14,165.  About 17.80% of families and 21.30% of the population were below the poverty line, including 28.80% of those under age 18 and 20.10% of those age 65 or over.

Politics
Like all of the eastern Pennyroyal Plateau and adjacent parts of the Western and Eastern Coalfields, Laurel County was strongly pro-Union during the Civil War. The county – in common with all adjacent areas – has been rock-ribbed Republican ever since. The only Democrats to receive forty percent of the county's vote since then have been Franklin D. Roosevelt in his 1932 landslide and Lyndon Johnson during an equally large landslide in 1964, although with the Republican Party mortally divided Woodrow Wilson did obtain a nine-vote plurality in 1912.*

Education
Two public school districts serve K-12 students in the county:
 Laurel County School District — Operates one preschool, 11 elementary schools, two middle schools, and two high schools.
 East Bernstadt Independent School District — Operates a single K-8 school. High school students in the district may attend high school in either of the Laurel County district's.

Communities

Cities
 Corbin (Mostly in Whitley County; part also in Knox County)
 London

Census-designated places
 East Bernstadt
 North Corbin

Other unincorporated communities
 Keavy
 Lake
 lily

Notable residents
 Nationally bestselling author Silas House was born and raised in Laurel County. 
 Former University of Kentucky basketball star Jeff Sheppard who briefly played in the NBA
 2000 ASCAP Songwriter of the Year Darrell Scott, who has written hit songs for the Dixie Chicks, Travis Tritt, Brad Paisley, Patty Loveless, and many others, was born in London.
 Chera-Lyn Cook, the first from Southeast Kentucky to win the title of Miss Kentucky. Cook was talent winner and 4th runner-up to Miss America 1999.
 Flem D. Sampson, the 42nd governor of the State of Kentucky is from Laurel County.

See also

 National Register of Historic Places listings in Laurel County, Kentucky

Notes

References

External links

 
 Laurel County History Museum & Genealogy Center
 London-Laurel County Tourist Commission
 World Chicken Festival
 Levi Jackson Wilderness Road Park

 
1825 establishments in Kentucky
Counties of Appalachia
Kentucky counties
London, Kentucky micropolitan area
Populated places established in 1825